Hannah Williams may refer to:
 Hannah Williams (actress) (1911–1973), American actress, singer, and comedian
 Hannah Williams (athlete) (born 1998), British athlete
 Hannah Williams (murder victim) (1987–2001), British murder victim
 Hannah Williams (football), coach for Sierra Leone women's national football team
 Hannah Williams, Milkshake! presenter
 Hannah Williams, Miss Wales, 2017 finalist